is a private women's junior college in Tokyo, Japan, established in 1950.

External links
 Official website 

Educational institutions established in 1950
Private universities and colleges in Japan
Universities and colleges in Tokyo
1950 establishments in Japan
Japanese junior colleges